Father Auguste-Marie Hue (15 August 1840– 22 June 1917) was a French lichenologist.

Biography
Hue was born on 15 August 1840, in Saint-Saëns, Seine-Maritime. He was ordained as a priest in 1865. From 1890 to 1915 he was a chaplain at the Petites Sœurs des Pauvres in Levallois-Perret. He studied the lichens collected by the scientific expedition to Tunisia, the reports of which were published by Narcisse Théophile Patouillard (1854–1926). He also studied the lichens brought back by the French Antarctic Expeditions (1903–1905 and 1908–1910), commanded by Jean-Baptiste Charcot (1867–1936). Father  (1832–1900) sent him specimens collected in Louisiana. Hue has been credited for having introduced the lichen term  in an 1906 publication. Hue died on 22 June 1917, in Levallois-Perret.

n 1938, Carroll William Dodge and Gladys Elizabeth Baker published Huea, which is a genus of lichenized fungi in the family Lecanoraceae and named in Hue's honour.
Hueidea a monotypic genus of fungi was published by Kantvilas & P.M.McCarthy in 2003.

Selected publications

See also
 :Category:Taxa named by Auguste-Marie Hue

References

1840 births
1917 deaths
French chaplains
French lichenologists
People from Seine-Maritime